Andrea Schifano (born 10 December 1991) is a Belgian professional football player, who currently plays in the Ligue 2 for AC Arles-Avignon.

Career
Schifano began his career in the youth side with French club RC Lens and signed later for RAEC Mons. He played for RAEC Mons between June 2009 now signed his first professional contract for R.E. Mouscron. On 15 January 2010 Ligue 2 club Arles signed the Belgian forward on a free transfer.

References

1991 births
Living people
Belgian footballers
Ligue 2 players
Expatriate footballers in France
AC Arlésien players
Belgian people of Italian descent
RC Lens players
Royal Excel Mouscron players
Belgian Pro League players
Association football midfielders
Footballers from Hainaut (province)
Sportspeople from Mons
Belgian expatriate sportspeople in France
Belgian expatriate footballers